José "Pepe" Mel Pérez (born 28 February 1963) is a Spanish former footballer who played as a striker, currently a manager.

He amassed Segunda División totals of 215 matches and 78 goals over eight seasons, for Real Madrid Castilla, Castellón and Betis. He also played in La Liga with the last club.

Mel took up coaching in 1999, going on to be in charge of several teams, mainly Rayo Vallecano and Betis, leading the latter to the second-tier championship in 2011 and 2015.

Playing career

Castellón and Betis
Born in Madrid, Mel started his career with Real Madrid, joining the club's youth system in 1974 at the age of 11 and playing alongside the likes of Emilio Butragueño and Míchel, although he never represented the first team, only competing at senior level with the reserves. In late 1987, after a very brief spell with CA Osasuna, he moved to Segunda División with CD Castellón where he played two years, helping the Valencian Community side return to La Liga in his second season after an absence of seven years.

Mel enjoyed his best years at Real Betis, signing with the Andalusia team in 1989 and helping them achieve promotion in his debut campaign whilst winning the Pichichi Trophy with 22 goals, one better than in the previous season at Castellón. He scored 14 times the following year, but suffered immediate relegation; his debut in the competition was on 2 September 1990, and he found the net in a 2–2 home draw against Sporting de Gijón.

Late career
Mel played his remaining years in Segunda División B in Spain, and also in France, with Granada CF – two years – Benidorm CF and Getafe CF, splitting his final season between Angers SCO and Écija Balompié. He retired at the age of 35, with a Spanish second division tally of 195 games and 73 goals.

Coaching career

Early years and Rayo
Mel started coaching one year after retiring, his first club being amateurs CD Coslada in the Community of Madrid. In 2001, after one year at Real Murcia in division two, he replaced Valencia CF-bound Rafael Benítez at the helm of CD Tenerife, having his first spell in the top flight as a coach and suffering relegation.

In the following four seasons, Mel worked in the second level, being sacked early into 2005–06 by Polideportivo Ejido. Shortly after, he dropped down a tier and moved to Rayo Vallecano, helping the Madrid club return to the second division in his second year and subsequently leading it to the fifth place, with chances of promotion until the last month of competition.

Betis

On 15 February 2010, after a string of poor results, Mel was dismissed by Rayo, being replaced by director of football Felipe Miñambres who helped the side to the 11th place. In the summer he signed with former side Betis also in the second tier, leading the Verdiblancos back to the top flight in his first year.

Mel coached Betis to the seventh position in the 2012–13 campaign, with the subsequent qualification for the UEFA Europa League. He was relieved of his duties on 2 December 2013, however, after falling to a 4–0 derby loss at Sevilla FC and conceding a last-minute 2–2 home equaliser to Rayo Vallecano.

West Bromwich Albion
On 9 January 2014, Mel signed an 18-month contract with West Bromwich Albion of the Premier League. His first match in charge came 11 days later, a 1–1 home draw against Everton.

Mel obtained his first win in English football after seven games, with a 2–1 victory at Swansea City on 15 March 2014. On 12 May, one day after the end of the season where he led the Baggies to the 17th place, he left by mutual consent with a record of three wins from 17 games.

Return to Betis
Mel returned to former club Betis in December 2014, with a contract lasting until the end of the campaign. He was the April 2015 Segunda División Manager of the Month after his team won all their games, scoring 11 goals and conceding two. On 24 May, after only one loss in his tenure, the league was won as champions and promotion achieved with a 3–0 win over AD Alcorcón.

Mel was fired on 11 January 2016, with his team in 15th place following a poor run of form and also strained relationship.

Deportivo
On 28 February 2017, Mel was appointed at Deportivo de La Coruña until the end of the season, replacing the sacked Gaizka Garitano at a team two points above the relegation zone in the top division and winless in the new year. He was himself dismissed on 24 October, due to poor results.

Las Palmas
Mel was named manager of UD Las Palmas on 4 March 2019, replacing Paco Herrera who had been fired earlier the same day, and signed a contract until the end of the season. On 23 January 2022, he was relieved of his duties.

Málaga
On 21 September 2022, Mel joined Málaga CF also in the second division. He was sacked the following 25 January 2023, with the club still in the relegation places.

Outside football
Mel is also a novelist, having published three books, Liar, The Road to the Afterlife and The Test.

Managerial statistics

Honours

Player
Castellón
Segunda División: 1988–89

Manager
Rayo Vallecano
Segunda División B: 2007–08

Betis
Segunda División: 2010–11, 2014–15

Individual
Pichichi Trophy (Segunda División): 1989–90
Segunda División Manager of the Month: April 2015

References

External links

Betisweb stats and bio 

1963 births
Living people
Spanish footballers
Footballers from Madrid
Association football forwards
La Liga players
Segunda División players
Segunda División B players
Real Madrid C footballers
Real Madrid Castilla footballers
RSD Alcalá players
CA Osasuna players
CD Castellón footballers
Real Betis players
Granada CF footballers
Benidorm CF footballers
Getafe CF footballers
Écija Balompié players
Ligue 2 players
Angers SCO players
Spanish expatriate footballers
Expatriate footballers in France
Spanish expatriate sportspeople in France
Spanish football managers
La Liga managers
Segunda División managers
Segunda División B managers
Tercera División managers
CP Mérida managers
Real Murcia managers
CD Tenerife managers
Getafe CF managers
Deportivo Alavés managers
Polideportivo Ejido managers
Rayo Vallecano managers
Real Betis managers
Deportivo de La Coruña managers
UD Las Palmas managers
Málaga CF managers
Premier League managers
West Bromwich Albion F.C. managers
Spanish expatriate football managers
Expatriate football managers in England
Spanish expatriate sportspeople in England